Manny Pacquiao vs. DK Yoo, billed as "Pacman vs. DK", was an exhibition boxing match contested between former eight-division world champion Manny Pacquiao and martial artist DK Yoo. The fight took place on December 11, 2022.

Background
An exhibition match featuring Manny Pacquiao, a retired Filipino professional boxer who was a former eight-division world champion, and South Korean YouTuber DK Yoo was organized. The former's last bout prior to his retirement was Manny Pacquiao vs. Yordenis Ugás on August 21, 2021. Pacquiao lost his fight against Yordenis Ugás via an unanimous decision. Pacquiao, who was also an incumbent senator at the time, retired from professional boxing to focus on his presidential campaign for the 2022 Philippine elections. Pacquiao lost the election. Pacquiao has clarified that the match should not be interpreted as him coming out of retirement.

Yoo aside from being an internet personality, is a self-defense instructor and martial artist practitioner himself. He has previously fought mixed-martial artist Brad Scott in a non-scoring match.

The fight had a format of six rounds of two minutes each instead of the customary four rounds of three minutes each. There is no agreed weight limit imposed on both fighters. This places Pacquiao at a disadvantage in terms of weight. In the weigh-in on December 10, Pacquiao had a recorded weight of  while Yoo's weight was measured to be .

All the proceeds of the match will go to charity, with the beneficiaries being families affected by the 2022 Russian invasion of Ukraine and the homeless in the Philippines. Part of the proceeds will go to the Filipino boxer's charity, the Pacquiao Foundation which builds houses for indigents.

The bout was held at the Korea International Exhibition Center in Goyang, South Korea on December 11, 2022. Pacquiao won over Yoo via an unanimous decision. The win does not affect Pacquiao's professional record.

Fight card

Broadcasting

See also
Floyd Mayweather Jr. vs. Logan Paul

References

Boxing matches
2022 in boxing
2022 in Philippine sport
Boxing matches involving Manny Pacquiao
Boxing in South Korea
2022 in South Korean sport
December 2022 sports events in South Korea
December 2022 sports events in the Philippines
Charity events in South Korea
Charity sports events
Sport in Goyang